Jakhara (Devanagari: जखारा Jakhárá) is a village in Morar block of Gwalior district, in Madhya Pradesh, India. As of 2011, the village population is 2,096, in 369 households.

History 
At the beginning of the 20th century, Jakhara was part of Gwalior State. Located in Pichhore pargana of zila Gird Gwalior, it had a population of 713 and an area of 5,901 bighas. The village had a Sayar Naka.

References 

Villages in Gwalior district